Vilpatti is a Panchayat in Kodaikanal Taluk of Dindigul district, Tamil Nadu state, South India. It is composed of the main village of Vilpatti and 11 hamlets. Main Vilpatti village  is 9 km North of Kodaikanal town, but hamlets within its administration extend to the Palani ghat road. It is an agricultural area with the primary crops of potatoes, carrot, coffee and bananas.

The Ministry of Rural Development, rural roads connectivity project Pradhan Mantri Gram Sadak Yojana  (PMGSY), has identified 12 habitations in Vilpatti: Vilpatty Gurusedimethu, Pethuparaipirivu, Attuvampatty, Periyaodai, Araikal, Uppuparaimethu, Bharathi annanagar, Kovilpatty, Pallangi, Perumpallam, Ganesapuram, Kurinji nagar.

Demographics
Population in 1991 was 5,140 males; 4,854 females; 9,994 total   The main Jāti communities are Reddiars, Pillais, Mannadiars, and Mudaliars. In 2001 the population of  Dalit in 8 villages was:

The Paliyan people are a major portion of the tribal community in Vilpatti.

Schools
There are 10 primary schools in Vilpatti Panchayat including 6 Panchayat Union Schools, Gandhiji Aided Primary School, St Marys Aided Primary School, Un Aid Primary School and Un Aid Nursery Primary School. There is a Government High School at Vilpatti and many children from Vilpatti area go to St. Xavier's High School in Kodaikanal.

The Vilpatti Village Project (VVP) started on 15 February 1989, via a strong connection between local women and Christine King, (née Cox) who raised funds and was financially supported by the International Childcare Trust UK. The project initially ran  medical, educational, vocational and childcare programmes to meet the practical needs of poor women and children.

The Satya Surabhi School in Attuvampatti valley provides value-based education and nutritious noon meals to children of the farm labourers and petty vendors of Attuvampatti.

The Mother Teresa Women's University expanded their facilities to an additional 55 ha (22 acre) campus at Attuvampatti valley in 2004. 
MTWU is distinctive as India's only university exclusively devoted to women's issues.  
The Kodaikanal Institute of Technology at Machur Village is a 180-seat self-financed engineering college at Vilpatti granting B.E. degrees in Computer Science & Engineering, Electronics and Communication Engineering, Information Technology.

Tourism
Elephant Valley Estate at Ganesh Puram  near Vilpatti, is a  private nature reserve and organic farm welcoming eco-tourists. They offer private cottages, tent houses, an Indo-continental fusion organic foods restaurant, trekking, nature walks and horse riding. They promote the conservation of traditional varieties of fruits, vegetables and cereals. They have orchards of lime, orange, avocados, guavas and amla inter-cropped with coffee, pepper, vanilla, cinnamon, nutmeg, mangoes, jack fruit, pomegranate, guavas and bananas. The estate provides local jobs and makes a contribution to sustainable development of the area. 

Hill Country Holiday Resorts in Attuvampatti offers a wide choice of reasonably priced rooms, suites and cottages, three specialty restaurants and conference facilities. Other club facilities include a games room, a fully equipped health club, billiards and snooker, putt-putt golf, outdoor play areas, an amphitheatre, bar, CCTV, children playroom, sight seeing tours, doctor on-call, Shuttlecock court, library, evening entertainment, trekking and an in-h\house provision store.

Sterling Valley View Resort offers modern rooms, apartments, cottages and time shares on a panoramic hill top, off Pallangi Road in Attuvampatti. Their facilities include  multi cuisine restaurant, 24-hour room service, 450 seat conference/banquet hall with OHP, Screen, VCR, LCD and computer, travel desk, Free Newspaper, Jacuzzi, Sauna, Secretarial Service, Satellite TV, medical facility with doctor on-call, cocktail Lounge and Live Entertainment discotheque, library, safe Deposit vaults, STD/ISD telephones, grocery shop, playground, auto and bicycles rental, laundry, coffee shop and a souvenir shop.

A popular 16 km hiking route between Kodaikanal and Palni passes through Vilpatti.

References

Villages in Dindigul district